Imran Ali (born 15 April 1983) is a Pakistani first-class cricketer who played for Faisalabad.

References

External links
 

1983 births
Living people
Pakistani cricketers
Faisalabad cricketers
Attock Group cricketers
Cricketers from Faisalabad